Buffy the Vampire Slayer is a 1992 American comedy horror film directed by Fran Rubel Kuzui and starring Kristy Swanson, Donald Sutherland, Paul Reubens, Rutger Hauer, Luke Perry, Hilary Swank, and David Arquette. It follows a Valley Girl cheerleader named Buffy who learns that it is her fate to hunt vampires. It was a moderate success at the box office, but received mixed reception from critics. The film took a different direction from that which its writer, Joss Whedon, intended.  Five years later, he created the darker, and critically acclaimed, television series of the same name.

Plot
Buffy Summers is a cheerleader at Hemery High School in Los Angeles. Her main concerns are shopping and spending time with her rich, snooty friends and her boyfriend, Jeffrey. While at school one day, she is approached by a man who calls himself Merrick. He informs her that she is The Slayer, or Chosen One, destined to kill vampires and his duty is to guide and train her. She initially rejects his claim but changes her mind when he vividly describes a recurring dream of hers. Additionally, Buffy is exhibiting abilities not known to her, including heightened agility, senses, and endurance, yet she repeatedly tries Merrick's patience with her frivolous nature, indifference to slaying, and sharp-tongued remarks.

Conflict starts with local vampire king, Lothos, and his acolyte, Amilyn. Two young men, Oliver Pike and Benny, are out drinking when they're attacked by Amilyn. Benny is turned, but Pike is saved by Merrick. As a vampire, Benny visits his friend Pike and tries to get him to join him. Amilyn also abducts Cassandra, a girl from Buffy's class, and sacrifices her to Lothos.

Pike decides to leave town when he realizes he is no longer safe. His plan is thwarted when he encounters Amilyn and his gang of vampires. Buffy and Merrick rescue him. After this encounter, Buffy and Pike start a friendship that eventually becomes romantic, and Pike becomes Buffy's partner in fighting the undead.

Buffy discovers her friend Grueller is a vampire. Shortly after he is dispatched, Buffy encounters Lothos and Amilyn. The vampire king puts Buffy into a hypnotic trance. Merrick intervenes, but he is killed by Lothos when he attempts to stake him. As Merrick dies, he tells Buffy to do things her own way rather than live by the rules of others.

At school, Buffy attempts to explain things to her friends, but they refuse to understand her, as they are more concerned with an upcoming school dance. Buffy falls out with them as she realizes she has outgrown their immature, selfish behavior.

At the senior dance, Buffy is dismayed to find Jeffrey has dumped her for one of her friends. She meets with Pike, and dances with him instead. Lothos sends his army of vampire minions to the school to attack the dance. During the attack, students and attendants try to fight off the vampires in the gym. Pike fights and kills Benny, while Buffy confronts Amilyn and Lothos in the school’s basement. She kills Amilyn, but Lothos starts to hypnotize her again. The trance is broken when Buffy is reminded of Merricks’s last words and she defends herself against Lothos.

Buffy returns to the gym and Lothos suddenly emerges with a sword. The Slayer and vampire king duel, and Buffy manages to defeat him. The survivors leave, Buffy and Pike share another dance and the couple ride away on a motorcycle.

Cast

Production
Writer Whedon sold the film to country singer Dolly Parton's production company, Sandollar, in the fall of 1991. Production was limited to five weeks to accommodate Luke Perry's Beverly Hills, 90210 filming schedule.

Whedon was involved in an advisory role early in the production but departed after becoming dissatisfied with the direction the film was taking. Executives at 20th Century Fox removed many of Whedon's jokes, believing the humor to be too abstract for audiences. They also disliked the darker elements in Whedon's original script, wanting to make it a lighter comedy. Merrick's suicide was replaced with his being killed by Lothos, and Buffy's burning down her high school gym to kill all the vampires was eliminated altogether.

All this led Whedon to finally walk off the set. He has been highly critical of actor Donald Sutherland's behavior on set, describing him as entitled and difficult to work with. Sutherland had a penchant for improvising or altering his lines in the script, which director Rubel Kuzui allowed him to do freely because he was the film's most high-profile star. Whedon felt this made Merrick's dialogue in the film disjointed and unintelligible.

Filming in Los Angeles included the ballroom of the Park Plaza Hotel, where Merrick lives and trains Buffy, John Marshall High School in Los Feliz, and the gymnasium of University High School in West Los Angeles, where the high school dance and vampire attack was filmed.

Reception

Box office
The film debuted at #5 at the North American box office and eventually grossed $16,624,456 against a $7 million production budget.

Critical reception
On review aggregator website Rotten Tomatoes, the film has an approval rating of 36%, based on 53 reviews, with an average rating of 4.4/10. The consensus reads, "Buffy the Vampire Slayers supernatural coming of age tale is let down by poor directing and even poorer plotting -- though Kristy Swanson and Paul Reubens' game performances still manage to slay." On Metacritic, the film has a weighted average score of 48 out of 100, based on 17 critics, indicating "mixed or average reviews".

Home media
The film was released on VHS and Laserdisc in the U.S. in November 1992 and in the U.K. in April 1993 by Fox Video and re-released in 1995 under the Twentieth Century Fox Selections banner. It was released on DVD in the U.S. in 2001 and on Blu-ray in 2011.

Television

The film was taken in a different direction from what one of its writers Joss Whedon intended, and five years later, he created the darker and acclaimed TV series of the same name.

Many of the details given in the film differ from those of the later television series. For example, Buffy's age and history are dissimilar; she is a senior in high school in the film, but the series starts with her as a sophomore. The film does portray who the Buffy of the TV series was before she learned of her destiny as the Slayer: a popular but selfish and superficial cheerleader. In the film, her parents are wealthy but negligent socialites who care little for her and spend their time at parties and golf tournaments; in the TV series, Buffy has a caring, newly divorced mother named Joyce. The supernatural abilities of both vampires and the Slayer are depicted differently. The vampires in the film die like humans; in the TV series, they turn to dust. Unlike the TV series, their faces remain human albeit pale, fanged, and with notched ears, whereas in the TV series, they take on a demonic aspect, especially when newly raised. The TV series suggests that new vampires must consciously learn to maintain a human appearance. In the film, Merrick is hundreds of years old, having lived many lives training many Slayers; in the TV series, Watchers are mortal and specially trained for their role and mission. Merrick's British accent and the manner of his death are different when he appears in flashbacks in the TV series.

Joss Whedon has expressed his dissatisfaction with the film's interpretation of the script, stating, "I finally sat down and had written it and somebody had made it into a movie, and I felt like — well, that's not quite her. It's a start, but it's not quite the girl."

According to the Official Buffy Watcher's Guide, Whedon wrote the pilot to the TV series as a sequel to his original script, which is why the TV series makes references to events that did not occur in the film. In 1999, Dark Horse Comics released a graphic novel adaptation of Whedon's original script under the title The Origin. Whedon stated: "The Origin comic, though I have issues with it, CAN pretty much be accepted as canonical. They did a cool job of combining the movie script with the series, that was nice, and using the series Merrick and not a certain OTHER thespian who shall remain hated."

Soundtrack
 

Other songs featured in the film but not the soundtrack album include: "Everybody Hurts" by R.E.M., "In the Wind" by War Babies, and "Inner Mind" by Eon.

Possible remake
On May 25, 2009, The Hollywood Reporter reported that Roy Lee and Doug Davison of Vertigo Entertainment were working with Fran Rubel Kuzui and Kaz Kuzui on a re-envisioning or relaunch of the Buffy film for the big screen. The film would not be a sequel or prequel to the existing film or television franchise, and Joss Whedon would have no involvement in the project. None of the characters, cast, or crew from the television series would be featured. Television series executive producer Marti Noxon later reflected that this story might have been produced by the studio in order to frighten Whedon into taking the reins of the project. On November 22, 2010, The Hollywood Reporter confirmed that Warner Bros. had picked up the movie rights to the remake. The film was set for release sometime in 2012. 20th Century Fox, which usually holds the rights to both  Buffy and Angel television series, would retain merchandising and some distribution rights.

The idea of the remake caused wrath among fans of the TV series, since Whedon was not involved. The project did not have any connection with the show and would not conform to the continuity maintained with the Buffy the Vampire Slayer Season Eight and Season Nine comic book titles. Not only the fandom, but the main cast members of both the Buffy and Angel series expressed disagreement with the report on Twitter and in recent interviews. Sarah Michelle Gellar said, "I think it's a horrible idea. To try to do a Buffy without Joss Whedon... to be incredibly non-eloquent: that's the dumbest idea I've ever heard." Proposed shooting locations included Black Wood and other areas in rural England, due to budgetary constraints and the potential setting being outside of the city, an unusual change for the franchise.

In December 2011, more than a year after the official reboot announcement, the Los Angeles Times site reported that Whit Anderson, the writer picked for the new Buffy movie, had her script rejected by the producers behind the project, and that a new writer was being sought. Sources also stated that "If you're going to bring it back, you have to do it right. [Anderson] came in with some great ideas and she had reinvented some of the lore and it was pretty cool but in the end there just wasn't enough on the page."

As of July 2018, Joss Whedon announced at San Diego Comic Con that he was working on a reboot of the series and that it might feature a slayer of color.

See also
 The Origin, a comic book reinterpretation of the movie script
 Vampire film

References

External links

 
 
 
 

1990s comedy horror films
1990s high school films
1990s teen comedy films
1990s teen horror films
1992 films
1992 horror films
20th Century Fox films
20th Century Studios franchises
American comedy horror films
American dark fantasy films
American high school films
American supernatural horror films
American teen comedy films
American teen horror films
Cheerleading films
Supernatural comedy films
Supernatural fantasy films
1990s feminist films
Films about proms
Films adapted into television shows
Films scored by Carter Burwell
Films set in Los Angeles
Films shot in Los Angeles
Films with screenplays by Joss Whedon
Vampire comedy films
Buffy the Vampire Slayer
Film
American feminist comedy films
American action comedy films
American action horror films
1992 action comedy films
1990s English-language films
1990s American films